Bonis or Bónis may refer to:

People

 Désirée Bonis (b. 1959), Dutch politician and diplomat
 Francesco De Bonis (b. 1982), Italian road bicycle racer
 Giambattista Bonis (b. 1926), Italian footballer (soccer player)
 György Bónis (1914-1985), Hungarian jurist and researcher of legal history
 Mélanie Bonis (1858-1937), French composer
 Nicolas Bonis (b. 1981), French professional footballer (soccer player)

Places
 Bonis Airfield, an airfield on Bougainville Island during World War II
 Bonis Peninsula, a peninsula on Bougainville Island, Papua New Guinea

Other
 Bonis Hall, a former country house in England

See also 
 Boni (disambiguation)
 Curator bonis
 De bonis non administratis
 Arrestandis bonis ne dissipentur
 Arresto facto super bonis mercatorum alienigenorum
 List of Latin phrases